Milan Jeremić (Serbian Cyrillic: Милaн Jepeмић, born 22 September 1988) is a Serbian footballer.

Career
His career started in Serbia when Red Star Belgrade signed him after a successful trial at age of 16. However, after alerting attention from other European Clubs, Red Star Belgrade sold the youngster to S.L. Benfica, where he has been one of their most prolific goal scorers for the junior squad, averaging over 1 goal in every 2 games. In December 2009, he signed a 3,5 year contract with Red Star Belgrade.

Career statistics

External sources
 Profile at Srbijafudbal.
 Stats from PrvaLigaSrbije.
 Milan Jeremić Stats at utakmica.rs
 

Living people
1988 births
Footballers from Belgrade
Serbian footballers
Association football midfielders
Serbian expatriate footballers
Expatriate footballers in Portugal
Expatriate footballers in Belarus
Serbian SuperLiga players
FK Sinđelić Beograd players
FK Zemun players
Red Star Belgrade footballers
FK Borac Čačak players
FK Kolubara players
FK Sloboda Užice players
FK Dinamo Vranje players
FC Gorodeya players
FK Dinamo Pančevo players